The Herschel 400 catalogue is a subset of William Herschel's original Catalogue of Nebulae and Clusters of Stars, selected by Brenda F. Guzman (Branchett), Lydel Guzman, Paul Jones, James Morrison, Peggy Taylor and Sara Saey of the Ancient City Astronomy Club in St. Augustine, Florida, United States c. 1980.  They decided to generate the list after reading a letter published in Sky & Telescope by James Mullaney of Pittsburgh, Pennsylvania, USA.

In this letter Mr. Mullaney suggested that William Herschel's original catalogue of 2,500 objects would be an excellent basis for deep sky object selection for amateur astronomers looking for a challenge after completing the Messier Catalogue.

The Herschel 400 is a subset of John Herschel's General Catalogue of Nebulae and Clusters published in 1864 of 5,000 objects, and hence also of the New General Catalogue.

The catalogue forms the basis of the Astronomical League's Herschel 400 club.  In 1997, another subset of 400 Herschel objects was selected by the Rose City Astronomers of Portland, Oregon as the Herschel II list, which forms the basis of the Astronomical League's Herschel II Program.

Vital statistics 

 The catalogue contains 400 objects
 All objects are from the NGC
 All visible in mid northern latitudes (they were all observed by Herschel from the UK)
 All visible in 150 mm (6") or larger telescopes

Distribution of Herschel 400 objects

Herschel 400 objects that are also Messier objects

The Herschel 400 contains 17 objects that are part of the Messier catalogue:

 M20 NGC 6514 Trifid Nebula
 M33 NGC 598 Triangulum Galaxy
 M47 NGC 2422
 M48 NGC 2548
 M51B NGC 5195 companion to the Whirlpool Galaxy
 M61 NGC 4303
 M76 NGC 651 Little Dumbbell Nebula/Barbell Nebula (northern portion)
 M82 NGC 3034 Cigar Galaxy
 M91 NGC 4548
 M102? NGC 5866 Spindle Galaxy (not certainly a Messier object)
 M104 NGC 4594 Sombrero Galaxy
 M105 NGC 3379
 M106 NGC 4258
 M107 NGC 6171
 M108 NGC 3556
 M109 NGC 3992
 M110 NGC 205

Herschel 400 objects that are also Caldwell objects
The Herschel 400 catalogue pre-dates the Caldwell catalogue by about 15 years.  The Caldwell catalogue contains 44 objects that are members of the Herschel 400:

 C2 NGC 40 Bow-Tie Nebula
 C6 NGC 6543 Cat's Eye Nebula
 C7 NGC 2403
 C8 NGC 559
 C10 NGC 663
 C12 NGC 6946
 C13 NGC 457 Owl Cluster
 C14 NGC 869 Double Cluster
 C15 NGC 6826 Blinking Planetary
 C16 NGC 7243
 C18 NGC 185
 C20 NGC 7000 North America Nebula
 C21 NGC 4449
 C22 NGC 7662 Blue Snowball
 C23 NGC 891
 C25 NGC 2419
 C28 NGC 752
 C29 NGC 5005
 C30 NGC 7331
 C32 NGC 4631 Whale Galaxy
 C36 NGC 4559
 C37 NGC 6885
 C38 NGC 4565 Needle Galaxy
 C39 NGC 2392 Eskimo Nebula / Clown Face Nebula
 C40 NGC 3626
 C42 NGC 7006
 C43 NGC 7814
 C44 NGC 7479
 C45 NGC 5248
 C47 NGC 6934
 C48 NGC 2775
 C50 NGC 2244
 C52 NGC 4697
 C53 NGC 3115 Spindle Galaxy
 C54 NGC 2506
 C55 NGC 7009 Saturn Nebula
 C56 NGC 246
 C58 NGC 2360
 C59 NGC 3242 Ghost of Jupiter
 C60 NGC 4038 Brighter of two Antennae Galaxies
 C62 NGC 247
 C64 NGC 2362 Tau Canis Majoris Cluster
 C65 NGC 253 Sculptor Galaxy / Silver Coin Galaxy
 C66 NGC 5694

Number of objects by type in the Herschel 400

Number of Herschel 400 objects in each constellation

Herschel 400 objects

Key

1–100

101–200

201–300

301–400

See also
 :Category:IC objects
 :Category:NGC objects
 Caldwell catalogue
 Index Catalogue (IC)
 Messier Catalogue
 New General Catalogue (NGC)
 Revised Index Catalogue (RIC)
 Revised New General Catalogue (RNGC)

References

External links
Astronomical Leagues Herschel 400 club
SEDS Herschel 400 information
SEDS page on similar catalogues to Messier's
The Herschel 400 at the NGC/IC project
The Herschel 400 at the Saguaro Astronomy Club
Interactive star chart of Herschel 400

Astronomical catalogues